is a major passenger railway station located in the city of Atsugi, Kanagawa, Japan, operated by the private railway operator Odakyu Electric Railway.

Lines
Most local, section semi-express, and semi-express trains inbound from Shinjuku Station terminate at this stop and head back to Shinjuku. West of this station, most express trains stop at every station until the line terminus in Odawara Station. All rapid express and most limited express (Romancecar) services also stop here.

Station layout
The station is an elevated structure built into the building used by the Mylord shopping mall (one of four such shopping malls owned by the Odakyu Group). One of the station's exits leads directly into the 4th level of the shopping mall. The station has two island platforms serving four tracks.

Platforms

History
Later, from 15 October 1927, express trains began stopping at the station.

After the war, various services were reestablished. The local trains that had been operating between Shinjuku and Inada-Noborito station were run on the whole line, and Hon-Atsugi became a stop for local trains. At the same time, through trains were abolished (June 1945). Consecutively, Semi-Express (1 October 1946), Express (1 October 1949), Commuter Express (25 March 1955) and Commuter Semi-Express (25 March 1960) services were introduced. On 5 November 1964 the connection to the Sagami Railway was cut. From 1968, the Romancecar began stopping at Hon-Atsugi Station. From June 1976, the station building was rebuilt into an overhead station. Multi-level crossings were successively constructed around the station (29 March 1977) and from 31 March 1978, the line operated jointly with the Tokyo Metro Chiyoda Line and the JR Jōban Line. Later, on 23 March 1982, the Mylord Department Store opened within the station building  and the first two automatic ticket machines were installed.

From February 1, 1984 the Asagiri Romancecar service began stopping at Hon-Atsugi and on 15 October 1984, the Atsugi Bus Centre was completed. On 15 December 2004, rapid express and semi-section express services were introduced and began stops in Hon-Atsugi. AEDs were installed in the station on 23 February 2006. In March 2006, waiting rooms were constructed on all platforms.

Station numbering was introduced in January 2014 with Hon-Atsugi being assigned station number OH34.

Passenger statistics
In fiscal 2019, the station was used by an average of 151,791 passengers daily.

The passenger figures for previous years are as shown below.

Surrounding area
Atsugi City Hall
Atsugi Municipal Hospital
Atsugi City Plaza
Atsugi Post Office
Shoin University Atsugi Station Campus

The station also serves as a transfer point for local and intercity buses operated by Kanagawa Chuo, with direct service to Morioka, Shin-Yokohama Station, Narita Airport, Haneda Airport, Osaka, Kyoto, and Nara.

See also
List of railway stations in Japan

References

External links
Hon-Atsugi Station (Odakyū) 

Railway stations in Japan opened in 1927
Odakyu Odawara Line
Stations of Odakyu Electric Railway
Railway stations in Kanagawa Prefecture
Atsugi, Kanagawa